Sergey Evgenyevich Lopatin (19 March 1939 – 17 January 2004) was a Russian lightweight weightlifter. Trained by his father, Olympic weightlifter Yevgeny Lopatin, he won silver medals at the world and European championships in 1961. Between 1961 and 1966, he set 11 ratified world records: six in the press, three in the snatch and two in the total. He won the Soviet title in 1961 and 1965.

References

1939 births
Sportspeople from Saratov
2004 deaths
Russian male weightlifters
European Weightlifting Championships medalists
World Weightlifting Championships medalists
20th-century Russian people
21st-century Russian people